Clara Evans (born 27 November 1993) is an elite British long-distance runner who has represented Great Britain and Wales. She is a member of Pontypridd Rodents Athletics Club and the Welsh Endurance Squad.

In 2022, she competed for Wales in the women’s marathon at the Commonwealth Games held in Birmingham, England. She finished in ninth place.

In 2021, she finished 5th in the British Olympic Trials and achieved the Commonwealth Games qualification time to represent Wales.

In 2020, she competed for Great Britain in the women's half marathon at the World Athletics Half Marathon Championships held in Gdynia, Poland.

In 2019, she was part of the Cardiff Athletics Club first ever team to win the ERRA Women’s National 4 stage Relays. 

On 26th November 2022 she became the joint fastest female ever to complete a UK parkrun at the weekly 5000 metre Cardiff event with a time of 15:49 and third fastest in the world.

She competes domestically and across Europe achieving podium places and race victories, holding numerous course records. At the 2022 TCS London Marathon she was the Elite Women’s Pacemaker.

Full details of performances can be viewed on the Power of 10 website. https://www.thepowerof10.info/athletes/profile.aspx?athleteid=2946929469

Clara’s Sports Agent is Astra Partners  https://astrapartners.global/

References

External links 
 
 

1993 births
Living people
Sportspeople from Hereford
British female long-distance runners
British female marathon runners
Commonwealth Games competitors for Wales
Athletes (track and field) at the 2022 Commonwealth Games
21st-century British women